is a Japanese cross country skier who competed from 1991 to 2003. Her best World Cup finish was fifth on three occasions, all in 1997.

Aoki also competed in three Winter Olympics, earning her best finish of 11th in the 15 km event at Lillehammer in 1994. Her best finish at the FIS Nordic World Ski Championships was 13th in the 15 km event at Val di Fiemme in 1991.

References 
 

1966 births
Living people
Japanese female cross-country skiers
Olympic cross-country skiers of Japan
Cross-country skiers at the 1992 Winter Olympics
Cross-country skiers at the 1994 Winter Olympics
Cross-country skiers at the 1998 Winter Olympics
Asian Games medalists in cross-country skiing
Cross-country skiers at the 1990 Asian Winter Games
Cross-country skiers at the 1999 Asian Winter Games
Asian Games gold medalists for Japan
Asian Games silver medalists for Japan
Asian Games bronze medalists for Japan
Medalists at the 1990 Asian Winter Games
Medalists at the 1999 Asian Winter Games
20th-century Japanese women